Lure of Ambition is a 1919 American silent drama film directed by Edmund Lawrence, and starring Theda Bara.

The film is now considered lost, though an 82-second outtake is known to survive.

Plot 

Olga Dolan is a poor young woman working as a public stenographer at a hotel in New York. She allures Cyril Ralston, a nobleman, and starts to have a romantic relationship with him. Ralston promises Olga that they will get married soon. However, he returns to England leaving Olga. After being deceived by Ralston, Olga vows revenge. She goes to England and begins working as a secretary to Lady Constance Bromley. Later, Olga finds out that Ralston is Bromley's son and that he is a married man. Although Ralston still pursues her, Olga becomes interested in another nobleman, Duke of Ruthledge, and eventually becomes his private secretary impressing him. After the Duke's wife died due to heart attack caused by jealousy, there is no obstacle for Olga to marry the duke.

Cast

References

External links 
 Lure of Ambition on IMDb
 Lure of Ambition at Silent Era

1919 films
1919 drama films
American silent feature films
American black-and-white films
Fox Film films
Silent American drama films
1919 lost films
Lost drama films
1910s American films
1910s English-language films